Spreuerhofstraße is, according to Guinness World Records, the world's narrowest street, found in the city of Reutlingen, Germany. The lane was built in 1727 during the reconstruction efforts after the area was destroyed in the massive citywide fire of 1726 and is officially listed in the Land-Registry Office as City Street Number 77.

See also 
 L'Androuno: A narrow street in Gassin, France. (29 cm at narrowest point)
Vrbnik: contains Ulica Klančić, 40–50 cm wide.
 Parliament Street, Exeter: A narrow street in the United Kingdom (64 centimetres). 
 Fan Tan Alley: A narrow street in Victoria, Canada (90 centimetres). 
 Mårten Trotzigs Gränd: A narrow street in Stockholm, Sweden (90 centimetres). 
 Ulica Stjepana Konzula Istranina: A narrow street in Porec, Istria Croatia, (100 cm).
 Strada Sforii: A narrow street in Brașov, Romania (111 centimetres). 
 Rue du Chat-qui-Pêche: A narrow street in Paris (180 centimetres). 
 9 de Julio Avenue: The world's widest street, in Buenos Aires.

References

Reutlingen
Pedestrian streets in Germany